Seth Lathrop Weld (February 19, 1879 – December 20, 1958) was a soldier in the United States Army and a Medal of Honor recipient for his actions in the Philippine–American War.

Weld joined the Army from Altamont, Tennessee, in April 1899, and retired with the rank of colonel in September 1933.

Medal of Honor citation
Rank and organization: Corporal, Company L, 8th U.S. Infantry. Place and date: At La Paz, Leyte, Philippine Islands, December 5, 1906. Entered service at: Altamont, Tennessee. Birth: Sandy Hook, Maryland. Date of issue: October 20, 1908.

Citation:

With his right arm cut open with a bolo, went to the assistance of a wounded constabulary officer and a fellow soldier who were surrounded by about 40 Pulajanes, and, using his disabled rifle as a club, beat back the assailants and rescued his party.

See also

List of Philippine–American War Medal of Honor recipients

References

External links

1879 births
1958 deaths
United States Army Medal of Honor recipients
United States Army soldiers
People from Washington County, Maryland
American military personnel of the Philippine–American War
Philippine–American War recipients of the Medal of Honor